Amanda Hale (born 2 October 1982) is a British actress.

Early life
Hale is one of four children born to Irish immigrant parents in northwest London. Her cousin is scientist Martin Glennie. She had been due to go to Oxford University to study  English but changed her mind and decided to become an actress.

Career
Hale trained at the Royal Academy of Dramatic Art, graduating in 2005 with a BA in Acting Degree (H Level) and has performed on both stage and screen. Some of her earliest acting experience include a couple of plays at the National Youth Theatre.

At drama school, she won the Audience Prize and Best Fight Award at the 2003 RADA Prize Fights. She was also nominated for two Evening Standard Theatre Awards (the Milton Shulman Award for Outstanding Newcomer and Best Actress) in November 2007 for her critically acclaimed performance as Laura Wingfield in Tennessee Williams' classic play The Glass Menagerie at the Apollo Theatre in London.

In September 2009, Hale made her Royal National Theatre debut in Our Class, a new play by Tadeusz Slobodzianek, and in October 2009, she appeared alongside Robbie Coltrane and Sharon Small in the new three-part ITV1 drama Murderland. In April 2011, she appeared as Agnes Rackham in the BBC adaptation The Crimson Petal and the White with co-star Romola Garai. The following year, she collaborated again with Garai in the short film Scrubber. In June 2013, she played Margaret Beaufort, mother of Henry VII, in the BBC series The White Queen, based on Philippa Gregory's best-selling historical novel series The Cousins' War. In the same year, she starred as Elinor Dashwood in Helen Edmundson's BBC Radio 4 adaptation of Sense and Sensibility.

Select credits

References

External links
 

Actresses from London
British television actresses
British stage actresses
British radio actresses
British film actresses
Alumni of RADA
1982 births
Living people
21st-century British actresses
British people of Irish descent
National Youth Theatre members
21st-century English women
21st-century English people